Na Huideok (born 1966) is a South Korean poet.

Life
Na Huideok was born in Nonsan, South Chungcheong Province. She was raised in an orphanage in which her parents - Christians who sought to carry out the teachings of their religion through communal living - served on the administrative staff. Na has confessed that the experience of living with orphans had made her a precocious child, and that the recognition of the difference between herself and her playmates early on gave her a unique perspective on the world.

Reportedly, Na Huideok stumbled into the life of a poet unintentionally. While struggling between the religious ideals fostered by her parents and the causes upheld by the student movement she encountered in college, Na sought salvation in poetry. Na graduated from the Department of Korean Language and Literature at Yonsei University with both Master's and Doctorate degrees. She served as a professor in the Department of Creative Writing at Chosun University from 2001 to 2018, and has served as a professor at Seoul National University of Science and Technology since 2019.

Writing
Na Huideok's poetry is grounded in the force of life and growth as manifested in motherhood and plant life. Her first collection of poems, To the Roots (1991), and her second, The Words Stained the Leaves (1994), pierce the fog of hypocrisy and contradictions cast over daily life while maintaining a spirit of forgiveness and warmth. In order to become receptive to nature, Na Huideok believes it is necessary to “listen with her eyes and see with her ears.” Such effort is detailed in her third collection of poetry, It’s Not That Far From Here (1997), and her fourth, What Is Darkening (2001). Na Huideok juxtaposes “sound” and “darkness” to signal the process of “listening” with the eyes when “seeing” becomes useless as darkness falls.

Work

Works in translation
 What Is Darkening (2007) - translated by Choi Jongyoll
 Scale and Stairs: Selected Poems (2009) - translated by Christopher Merrill and Kim Won-Chung
 Wild Apple (2015) - translated by William Parker and Youngsil Ji

Works in Korean (partial)

Poetry
 To the Roots (1991)
 The Words Stained the Leaves (1994)
 It's Not That Far from Here (1997)
 What Is Darkening (2001)
 A Missing Palm (2004)
 Wild Apple (2009)
 Time for These Horses To Return (2014)
 To Her (2015)

Prose
 A Half-Bucket of Water (1999)
 Where Does Purple Come From? (2003)
 Remember Those Lights (2012)
 A Plate of Poems (2012)
 I'm Going To Get There on Foot Step by Step (2017)

Compilations
 Morning Song, Evening Poetry (2008)
 My Representative Poem (2012)
 Na Huideok's Glass Bottle Letter (2013)

Awards
 Kim Su-yeong Literature Prize (1998)
 This Year's Young Artist Award (2001)
 Contemporary Literature Prize (2003)
 Midang Literary Award (2014)

References 

1966 births
20th-century South Korean women writers
Living people
People from Nonsan
South Korean women poets
International Writing Program alumni
Midang Literary Award winners
21st-century South Korean women writers